Ashley Louise Urbanski (born March 14, 1992) is an American professional wrestler and singer. She is signed to WWE, where she performs on the SmackDown brand under the ring name Shotzi (shortened from her previous ring name Shotzi Blackheart). She is also known for her time in NXT, where she is a former NXT Women's Tag Team Champion.

Prior to joining WWE, she competed in various promotions on the independent circuit, including major promotions such as Shimmer Women Athletes, Evolve, and Shine Wrestling, where she won the Shine Nova Championship.

Early life 
Ashley Louise Urbanski was born in San Jose, California, on March 14, 1992. She is of Filipino and Polish descent.

Professional wrestling career

Early career (2014–2019) 
Urbanski began her career at Hoodslam in Oakland, California in 2014 as Missy Highasshit, a cheerleader valet for the stable Stoner U. She also frequently appeared on the California independent circuit, wrestling for All Pro Wrestling, Bar Wrestling, and Big Time Wrestling, as well as Nashville, Tennessee promotion Impact Wrestling.

Urbanski made her debut for Shimmer Women Athletes on November 11, 2016, in a loss to Melanie Cruise. She made her Evolve debut at Evolve 115 on November 9, 2018, challenging Allysin Kay for the Shine Championship in a losing effort. Blackheart also competed for Shine Wrestling, and at Shine 58 on May 10, 2019, Blackheart defeated Aja Perera to win the Shine Nova Championship. At Shine 59 on June 29, she retained the title in a triple threat match involving Perera and Santana Garrett. Blackheart successfully defended the title against Natalia Markova on August 24 at Shine 60.

At Evolve 137 on October 11, 2019, after defeating Perera, William Regal offered Urbanski a WWE contract during an unannounced appearance, and due to this, she had to vacate the Shine Nova Championship.

WWE

Tough Enough (2015) 
In 2015, Blackheart, under her real name, took part in the trials for the sixth season of WWE's competition Tough Enough. She was initially selected as one of 6 women who would take part in that season's competition, but had to withdraw from it before it began, due to a previously undiagnosed irregular heartbeat causing a failed medical.

NXT (2019–2021) 
On October 15, 2019, it was reported that Blackheart had signed with WWE and would report to the WWE Performance Center. Blackheart made her debut on a live NXT house show on December 5, 2019, losing to Chelsea Green. She made her televised debut on the December 25 episode of NXT in a loss to Bianca Belair. On the January 15, 2020, episode of NXT, Blackheart entered a battle royal for an NXT Women's Championship opportunity at NXT TakeOver: Portland, eliminating Shayna Baszler until she was eliminated by Belair, the eventual winner. On the following episode of NXT, Blackheart lost to Baszler. At the Royal Rumble on January 26, 2020, Blackheart entered her first Royal Rumble match at #26 before being eliminated by Baszler. On the June 17 episode of NXT, Blackheart and Tegan Nox challenged Bayley and Sasha Banks for the WWE Women's Tag Team Championship, which they were unsuccessful in winning.

On the September 16 episode of NXT, Blackheart lost to NXT Women's Champion Io Shirai in a non-title match. At NXT: Halloween Havoc on October 28, she served as the host during that episode, preventing Shirai during her match against Candice LeRae from being attacked by a mysterious person wearing a Ghostface mask (later revealed as Indi Hartwell). She formed an alliance with Rhea Ripley, Shirai and Ember Moon to compete at the TakeOver: WarGames pay-per-view on December 6, where they faced off against LeRae, Toni Storm, Raquel González and Dakota Kai in a WarGames match, which her team lost.

At Royal Rumble on January 31, 2021, she entered at #5, but was eliminated by Baszler. Blackheart and Moon participated in the Women's Dusty Rhodes Tag Team Classic, defeating Marina Shafir and Zoey Stark in the first round, The Way (Candice LeRae and Indi Hartwell) in the semi-finals, but lost to Kai and González in the finals on February 14 at Vengeance Day. On the March 10 episode of NXT, Blackheart and Moon defeated Kai and González to win the NXT Women's Tag Team Championship, her first title in NXT. On the second night of NXT TakeOver: Stand & Deliver on April 8, they retained the titles against The Way. On the May 4 episode of NXT, Blackheart and Moon lost the titles to The Way in a Street Fight, ending their reign at 55 days. Blackheart competed in her final match in NXT on June 29, where she and Moon lost a triple threat tag team match to determine the #1 contenders to the NXT Women's Tag Team Championship.

SmackDown (2021–present) 
On the July 9 episode of SmackDown, Blackheart, now under the shortened ring name Shotzi, debuted alongside Tegan Nox as Shotzi & Nox, but the team was disbanded when, as part of the 2021 Draft, Nox was drafted to the Raw brand while Shotzi remained on the SmackDown brand. On the October 29 episode of SmackDown, after losing to SmackDown Women's Champion Charlotte Flair in a championship contenders match, Shotzi attacked Sasha Banks who was at ringside, turning heel in the process.

Shotzi participated in the 5 on 5 Survivor Series elimination match at Survivor Series on November 21, but was eliminated by Bianca Belair. She participated in the Royal Rumble match at the namesake event on January 29, 2022, entering at #29 but was eliminated by the returning Ronda Rousey. On the June 3 episode of SmackDown, Shotzi competed in a six-pack challenge to determine the #1 contender to the SmackDown Women's Championship, which was won by Natalya. On the June 24 episode of SmackDown, she defeated Tamina to qualify for the Money in the Bank ladder match on July 2, which she failed to win. On the August 5 episode of SmackDown, Shotzi competed in a gauntlet match to determine the #1 contender to Liv Morgan's SmackDown Women's Championship, which was won by Shayna Baszler. The following week, she and Xia Li participated in the WWE Women's Tag Team Championship Tournament for the vacant tag titles, but were eliminated by Raquel Rodriguez and Aliyah in the first round. On the August 26 episode of SmackDown, they competed in a "Last Chance" fatal four-way to be in the semifinals of the tournament later that night, which was won by Natalya and Sonya Deville.

On the September 16 episode of SmackDown, Shotzi saved Rodriguez from an attack by Damage CTRL (Dakota Kai and Iyo Sky), turning face in the process. On the October 21 episode of SmackDown, Shotzi and Rodriguez challenged Kai and Sky for the Women's Tag Team Championship, but were unsuccessful after Bayley distracted Shotzi. The next day, she served as the host for NXT Halloween Havoc alongside Quincy Elliot, attacking Lash Legend after she interrupted them. On the November 11 episode of SmackDown, Shotzi won a six-pack challenge, earning a SmackDown Women’s Championship match against Ronda Rousey at Survivor Series WarGames. At the event, Shotzi failed to win the title after interference from Shayna Baszler.

Other media 
In April 2021, Blackheart alongside Scarlett Bordeaux were featured on fellow wrestler and singer Harley Cameron's music video "Indestructible". On October 14, 2022, the trio performed "I Put a Spell on You" (as a tribute of the film Hocus Pocus) in a music video which was released by WWE.

Championships and accomplishments 
 Alternative Wrestling Show
 AWS Women's Championship (1 time)
 East Bay Pro Wrestling
 EBPW Ladies Championship (1 time)
 Gold Rush Pro Wrestling
 GRPW Lady Luck Championship (1 time)
 Hoodslam
 Best Athlete in the East Bay Championship (1 time)
 Intergalactic Tag Team Championship (1 time) – with Joey Ryan
 IWA Mid-South
 IWA Mid-South Women's Championship (1 time)
 Pro Wrestling Illustrated
 Ranked No. 30 of the top 150 female wrestlers in the PWI Women's 150 in 2021
 Rise Wrestling
 Phoenix of RISE Championship (1 time)
 Sabotage Wrestling
 Sabotage War of the Genders Championship (2 times)
 Shine Wrestling
 Shine Nova Championship (1 time)
 WWE
 NXT Women's Tag Team Championship (1 time) – with Ember Moon
 NXT Year-End Award (1 time)
 Breakout Star of the Year (2020)

References

External links 

 
 
 
 

1992 births
American female professional wrestlers
American people of Polish descent
American people of Filipino descent
American professional wrestlers of Filipino descent
Filipino female professional wrestlers
Living people
People from Los Angeles
Professional wrestlers from California
People from Santa Clara County, California
NXT Women's Tag Team Champions
21st-century American women
21st-century professional wrestlers